Paul Reps (September 15, 1895July 12, 1990) was an American artist, poet, and author. He is best known for his unorthodox haiku-inspired poetry that was published from 1939 onwards. He is considered one of America's first haiku poets.

In association with his writing, Reps was also a well-received artist. Many of his books have artwork influenced by Zen Buddhism displayed in association with his writings.

Life

Reps had widely traveled and spent a large amount of his time in Asia. In Japan, his art was widely accepted and he often went there in association with the displays of his artwork in galleries and to reaffirm his Buddhist understanding.

Reps was well-regarded in Japan. When his 2-month visa expired, he applied for a 1-year commercial visa at the consulate in Japan. They said it would take a month, "no exceptions." He returned 3 days later with the needed papers and agreed to wait the month. But he also included a poem:

The visa officer told him to return the next day. He did and was granted a one year visa with an extension good for 4 years. As Reps commented, "This is what a poem can do for you."

In the later years of his life, Reps made his home on the island of Maui in Hawaii. In the two years before his death, he lived at the Haven Institute with his friends Jock McKeen and Bennet Wong .

Works
 Zen Flesh, Zen Bones. A Collection of Zen and Pre-Zen Writings. This book includes Zen texts, but also the Vijnana Bhairava Tantra
 Unknot The World In You. His second book, which published through Sequoia University Press
 Zen Telegrams
 Letters to a friend: Writings & Drawings, 1939 to 1980
 Gold Fish Signatures
 Square Sun, Square Moon
 Sit In: What it is Like
 Let Good Fortune Jump on You
 Big Bath: Poems
 Unwrinkling Plays
 Ten Ways to Meditate
 Be! New Uses for the Human Instrument
 Juicing: Words and Brushwork

References

External links

 Paul Reps
 Paul Reps Playshop
 Paul Reps Remembrance

1895 births
1990 deaths
American male poets
English-language haiku poets
American spiritual writers
Zen Buddhism writers
American Zen Buddhists
20th-century American poets
20th-century American male writers
20th-century American non-fiction writers
American male non-fiction writers